Matt Barnes (born May 27, 1986) is an American football coach who is currently the defensive coordinator for the Memphis Tigers. He previously served as the special teams coordinator and defensive backs coach at Ohio State.

Playing career 
Barnes played linebacker for Salisbury University.

Barnes played Tailback and Safety for the Urbana Hawks during their then State record 50 game win streak. Becoming, along with Billy Gaines and Eric Lenz, one of the only Sophomores to make the start for Dave Carruthers at Urbana.

Coaching career 
Barnes began his coaching career in 2009 as the running backs coach for Delaware Valley University. In 2010, he coached running backs West Virginia Wesleyan College. In 2011, Barnes served as offensive coordinator and quarterbacks coach for West Virginia Wesleyan.

Barnes got his first coaching opportunity at the Division I level as a graduate assistant at the University of Florida. He held this role from 2012-2014.

In 2015, he joined the staff at the University of Michigan as a defensive analyst.

From 2016-2018, he served as linebackers coach and special teams coordinator for the University of Maryland.

Ohio State 
In 2019, Barnes accepted a job on Ryan Day's staff at Ohio State as assistant secondary coach and special teams coordinator. Prior to the 2020 season, Barnes was given the title of safeties coach and special teams coordinator. Barnes was then named the secondary coach on February 3, 2021.

Following defensive struggles for the Buckeyes in the beginning of the 2021 season, defensive coordinator Kerry Coombs was stripped of defensive play calling duties, which were given to Barnes.

Memphis  
On January 1, 2022, it was reported that Barnes would become the defensive coordinator at Memphis.

References 

1986 births
Living people
American football linebackers
Salisbury Sea Gulls football players
Delaware Valley Aggies football coaches
West Virginia Wesleyan Bobcats football coaches
Florida Gators football coaches
Michigan Wolverines football coaches
Maryland Terrapins football coaches
Ohio State Buckeyes football coaches